Jaime José Mañalich Muxi (born June 7, 1954) is a Chilean physician (nephrologist), and former Health Minister. He held the position during the first Piñera government (2010-2014) and assumed the role again in June 2019 until he was replaced in June 2020 amidst criticism over his handling of the COVID-19 pandemic in Chile.

The widespread eye injuries were one of the topics addressed during the impeachment of Minister of the Interior and Public Security Andrés Chadwick in November 2019. On November 20 Mañalich declared to the Chamber of Deputies that there was twelve persons with the loss of one eye and about thirty with serious injuries.

References

Living people
1954 births
Chilean Ministers of Health
People from Santiago
University of Chile alumni
2010 Copiapó mining accident
Chilean nephrologists